Gozan may refer to:
 Jazan, Saudi Arabia 
 The ancient River Gozan, Amu Darya, the River Amu or Oxus, a river in North Afghanistan and Central Asia.
 the Five Mountain System, a Japanese network of Zen temples (Gozan Seidō)
 Tell Halaf, a Syrian archeological site near the city of Guzana or Gozan